John Reynolds Gardiner (December 6, 1944 – March 4, 2006) was a writer best known for writing the book Stone Fox.

Personal life

Born in Los Angeles, California, he was a rebellious boy whose teachers believed he would never get anywhere in life.  He earned his master's degree from University of California, Los Angeles. He was an engineer before working on his first and best-known children's book, Stone Fox, which, at the time of his death in 2006, had sold four million copies. Always creative, in his younger years he ran Num Num Novelties, home to such originals as the aquarium tie. He lived in West Germany, El Salvador, Mexico, Italy, Ireland, and Idaho where he heard a local legend that inspired Stone Fox. He took a special class on screenplay and wrote Stone Fox as a movie, but a producer told him to publish it into a novel. Gardiner also edited children's stories for television. He lived out his final years with his wife, Gloria, in California and died of complications from pancreatitis in Anaheim, California.

Works
Novels
Stone Fox 
Top Secret 
General Butterfingers 
How to Live a Life That's Not Boring 

Filmography
Stone Fox (1987 TV film) (book)

References

External links

American male novelists
American children's writers
1944 births
2006 deaths
Writers from Los Angeles
Burials at Angelus-Rosedale Cemetery
Deaths from pancreatitis
20th-century American novelists
20th-century American male writers